Lung India is a peer-reviewed open-access medical journal published on behalf of the Indian Chest Society. The journal publishes articles on the subject of respiratory medicine including immunology, intensive care, sleep medicine, thoracic surgery, thoracic imaging, occupational health, and related subjects. It is indexed with Caspur, DOAJ, EBSCO Publishing’s Electronic Databases, Excerpta Medica/EMBASE, Expanded Academic ASAP, JournalSeek, Global Health, Google Scholar, Health & Wellness Research Center, Health Reference Center Academic, Hinari, Index Copernicus, Index Medicus for South-East Asia Region, Indian Science Abstracts, IndMed, MANTIS, MedInd, OpenJGate, ProQuest, PubMed, SCOLOAR, SIIC databases, and Ulrich's Periodicals Directory.
The Editorial board of Lung India consists of international experts in Pulmonary Medicine. Professor Parvaiz A Koul, MD, FRCP, FCCP is the current Editor-in-Chief of the journal. The journal is the most popular journal of Pulmonology from India.

External links 
Archive of Lung India

Open access journals
Quarterly journals
English-language journals
Publications established in 1982
Medknow Publications academic journals
Pulmonology journals
Academic journals associated with learned and professional societies of India
1982 establishments in India